Haris is a surname. Notable people with the surname include:

 Mohammad Haris (born 2001), Pakistani cricketer
 N. A. Haris (born 1967), Indian businessman and politician
 Niki Haris (born 1962), American singer, actress and dancer
 Parvez Haris (born 1964), Bangladeshi professor of biomedical science